Juan Manuel Cárcamo Flores (born 22 May 1974) is a retired Honduran football striker, who last played for Real Sociedad in the Honduran National League.

Club career
He started his career at Platense before joining fellow Hondurans Maynor Suazo and Julio César Suazo at Austrian team Wüstenrot Salzburg. He then moved to Austrian Second Division outfit BSV Bad Bleiberg, where he lined up alongside compatriots Reynaldo Clavasquín and Francisco Pavón.

In April 2011, Platense skipper Cárcamo scored his 100th career goal in the Honduran top tier against Deportes Savio, becoming only the third player to do so after Wilmer Velásquez and Denilson Costa. In November 2011, Platense announced the release of veteran Cárcamo, who scored 63 goals for the club.

In January 2012, El Abuelo (Grandpa) signed for Second Division side Real Sociedad with whom he won promotion to the top level.

International career
Cárcamo made his debut for Honduras in a November 1999 friendly match against Guatemala and has earned a total of 18 caps, scoring 3 goals. He has represented his country in 7 FIFA World Cup qualification matches.

His final international was a November 2004 FIFA World Cup qualification against Costa Rica.

International goals

References

External links

 “Espero poder anotar”: Juan Manuel Cárcamo – La Prensa 
 Cárcamo: “Vamos a tratar de ser más protagonistas – La Prensa 

1974 births
Living people
People from San Pedro Sula
Association football forwards
Honduran footballers
Honduras international footballers
Platense F.C. players
FC Red Bull Salzburg players
C.D. Olimpia players
C.D. Victoria players
C.D. Real Sociedad players
Liga Nacional de Fútbol Profesional de Honduras players
Austrian Football Bundesliga players
Honduran expatriate footballers
Expatriate footballers in Austria